Kiev Institute of Business and Technology or Kyiv Institute of Business and Technology (KIBiT) is a Ukrainian university founded in 1992 as the successor of Kyiv People's University for Technical Progress which was founded in 1961.

Universities in Ukraine
Educational institutions established in 1992
1992 establishments in Ukraine